Niall Robert Watson is an English semi-professional footballer who plays as a midfielder for Southport.

Club career

Accrington Stanley and loan moves 
On 19 September 2017, Watson made his professional debut for Accrington Stanley in their EFL Trophy tie against Middlesbrough U23s, replacing Mekhi Leacock-McLeod in the 3–2 victory.

On 22 January 2018, Watson joined Northern Premier League Premier Division side Marine on loan.

In August 2018 he joined Runcorn Linnets on loan.

On 11 January 2019, Watson joined Widnes on loan until the end of the season.

In July 2019 he joined Sligo Rovers on a season long loan.

In February 2020 he joined Airbus UK until the end of the season.

Southport 
In October 2020 it was announced that Watson would link up with his father, Liam Watson, at National League North side Southport after a successful trial. He made his first league appearance for the club on 6 October, coming on as a late substitute in the 0-0 draw against Hereford.

Career statistics

Personal life 
Niall is the son of former footballer and manager Liam Watson.

References

External links

Living people
English footballers
Association football midfielders
Accrington Stanley F.C. players
Marine F.C. players
English Football League players
Northern Premier League players
2000 births
Runcorn Linnets F.C. players
Sligo Rovers F.C. players
Southport F.C. players
Airbus UK Broughton F.C. players
Widnes F.C. players